Le Scandale de Monte-Carlo is a comedy in three acts by French dramatist and playwright Sacha Guitry, premiered at théâtre du Gymnase on 22 April 1908.

Original cast 
 Armand Davégna: Abel Tarride
 Paul Hebert: Charles Dechamps
 Lucien Aveze: Jean Dax
 The commissaire: Edmond Bauer
 Monsieur Alexis: Chambaz
 Henri : Paul-Edmond
 Countesse Davégna: 
 Rosette Vignon: Alice Clairville
 Marguerite Davégna: Marguerite Montavon
 Céline: Claudia
 Madame X: Lydia Buck
 The maid: De Massol

1908 plays
Plays by Sacha Guitry